The 1937 Oregon Webfoots football team represented the University of Oregon in the Pacific Coast Conference (PCC) during the 1937 college football season.  In their sixth and final season under head coach Prink Callison, the Webfoots compiled a 4–6 record (2–5 in PCC, eighth), and were outscored 158 to 114. 

Home games were played on campus at Hayward Field in Eugene and at Multnomah Stadium in Portland.

Schedule

References

External links
 WSU Libraries: Game video – Washington State vs. Oregon at Portland – November 6, 1937

Oregon
Oregon Ducks football seasons
Oregon Webfoots football